A Vow to Kill is a 1995 made for TV movie directed by Harry Longstreet, starring Richard Grieco and Julianne Phillips, and first televised on February 1, 1995.  Others in the cast include Peter MacNeill, Tom Cavanagh, Nicole Oliver and Larissa Laskin.

Plot

L.J. Berman (Larissa Laskin) is a deceitful psychotic conman. Eric (Richard Grieco) is married to beautiful, rich Rachel Waring (Julianne Phillips). He fakes himself and his wife being kidnapped in order to get ransom money from her Dad, Frank (Gordon Pinsent).

Cast

 Richard Grieco as Eric
 Julianne Phillips as Rachel Waring
 Gordon Pinsent as Frank Waring
 Peter MacNeill as Sam Flowers
 Tom Cavanagh as Andy Neiman
 Nicole Oliver as Linda Mason
 Larissa Laskin as L.J. Berman
 Lili Francks as Naomi Mills
 Dan Warry-Smith as Kevin Anson
 Christina Collins as Jack Flash Manager
 Andy Marshall as Walter
 Don Francks as Smithford
 Phil Morrison as Swift-Way Delivery
 Melanie Nicholls-King as Car Rental Agent
 Patrick Patterson as Bob Lambert
 Elva Mai Hoover as Ida Lambert
 Damir Andrei as Everett Thayer
 Ron Van Hart as Michael
 Jed Dixon as Security Officer
 Carolyn J. Silas as Air Freight Clerk
 Joe Coughlin as Vince
 Ho Chow as Swift-Way Clerk
 Fiona Highet as Jack Flash Messenger

Reception

The film can be considered a damsel-in-distress drama, featuring light bondage, and details Rachel's plight in trying to escape from the mean thug.

Variety wrote, "Physically if not emotionally, Grieco and Phillips manage to register blips on the tube even when they haven’t anything to say to each other, which is most of the time. The lovers’ romantic dialogue sounds as hollow as lines on a Hallmark card", and also wrote, "Director Harry S. Longstreet, who co-wrote the script with his wife, Renee (also the show’s producer), and Sean Silas, manages to maintain suspenseful pacing while making a movie that is centered on only Grieco and Phillips in their faraway island fairyland."

VideoHound's Golden Movie Retriever called the film a "Predictable cable thriller", and Chicago Sun-Times succinctly called the film a "stupid, sexist movie".

References

External links
 

American television films
1995 television films
1995 films